Saposa is an Austronesian language spoken on Bougainville, Papua New Guinea.

References

Northwest Solomonic languages
Languages of Papua New Guinea
Languages of the Autonomous Region of Bougainville